Heart of the Ages (stylized on the cover as HEart of the Ages) is the debut studio album by Norwegian black metal band In the Woods... The album was recorded at Star Studios in Norway with production of Trond Breen.

Track listing

Critical reception 

AllMusic called it "an album that even now, eight years after its original release, stands apart from virtually everything else on the black metal scene."

Personnel 
 In the Woods...
 X. Botteri – bass guitar
 Oddvar a:m – guitar
 Ovl. Svithjod – vocals
 C.M. Botteri – guitar
 Kobro – drums

References 

In the Woods... albums
1995 debut albums